Butte Creek is a stream in the U.S. state of Oregon, a tributary of the Pudding River.

Course 

Butte Basin contains Copper Lake and Butte Lakes at elevation . The stream meanders slightly northwest through steep mountainous and heavily forested terrain for about two-thirds of its length.

It receives Camp Creek from the right at river mile 32.9, then Fill Creek (right, RM 32.6).  It turns due west for the next two miles (3 km) and parallels South Gawley Ridge to the north and receives Rhody Creek (left, RM 31.8) which drains Rhody Lake, then Fibre Creek (left, RM 31.3) which drains Fibre Lake.  Shortly before resuming a northwesterly course, it receives South Fork (left, RM 30.7).  At river mile 29.3 it receives a short unnamed creek from the right at about elevation .  Butte Creek turns WSW for about a mile where it receives a two-mile (3 km) long unnamed creek from the left (RM 27.2), Kirk Creek (left, RM 26.8), then turns directly northwest.  About a half mile later it drops over Butte Creek Falls, elevation .

Over the next mile, it receives three small creeks all from the right including Looney Creek (RM 25.8).  It passes over a gravel bar, then receives three small creeks in succession from the left in a fairly steep forest canyon.  Afterward, the canyon widens somewhat, and a small creek which drains an agricultural plateau to the west enters from the left at RM 24.8, followed by Fall Creek (right, RM 23.9) where the canyon becomes a gentle valley.  Between RM 20 and 21.3, the creek passes over a succession of sand or gravel bars, and at RM 19.5, the creek turns northward—except for a few small zigzags—for the next .  It receives Coal Creek (right, RM 17.5) by which time the creek is surrounded by moderately gentle,  hills.

Unnamed creeks enter at RM 16.6 (right), RM 16.3 (left), RM 16.1 (right), RM 15.9 (left), 15.7 (left), 15.6 (right), and 14.8 (right).  By this point, the designated state forest is sparse islands and most of the land is agricultural or private forest.  An unnamed creek (possibly named Crooked Finger Creek for a road which parallels it) enters at RM 13.2 (left) in an impoundment formed by a dam just east of Scotts Mills.

Unnamed creeks enter at RM 10.8 (left) and RM 10.3 (left) near Jacks Bridge which carries Oregon Route 213 across Butte Creek at RM 10.2 and elevation . A river gaging station in Monitor is at RM 5.9. An unnamed creek enters from the right at RM 5.4, and the outlet of two reservoirs southeast of Woodburn is carried by an aqueduct entering from the left at RM 2.8. Oregon Route 211 crosses at approximately RM 1.5. Butte Creek enters the Pudding River at the latter's RM 20.1. The Marion/Clackamas County line follows the Pudding River downstream until Arndt Road.

See also 
 List of rivers of Oregon
 List of waterfalls in Oregon

References

External links
 Pudding River Watershed Council

Rivers of Oregon
Rivers of Marion County, Oregon
Rivers of Clackamas County, Oregon